The taekwondo competition in the 2003 Summer Universiade were held in Daegu, South Korea.

Medal overview

Men's events

Women's events

Medal table

References 
Sports123

2003 Summer Universiade
Universiade
2003
International taekwondo competitions hosted by South Korea